Luís Miguel Vieira Babo Machado (born 4 November 1992) is a Portuguese professional footballer who plays as a winger for Ekstraklasa club Radomiak Radom.

Club career
Born in Lamego, Viseu District, Machado joined U.S.C. Paredes in 1999, aged only six. In 2009, whilst still a junior, he made his senior debut, playing two fourth division games with the club.

In the summer of 2010, Machado signed with S.C. Freamunde, where he completed his development. He was promoted to the first team for the 2011–12 season, playing his first match in the Segunda Liga on 25 September 2011, a 1–0 away loss against C.F. Os Belenenses.

On 5 July 2014, Machado agreed to a two-year contract with another second-tier side, C.D. Tondela. He scored two goals in 26 matches in his first year, as they reached the Primeira Liga for the first time in 82 years of history.

Machado made his debut in the Portuguese top flight on 14 August 2015, starting in a 1–2 home defeat to Sporting CP. In the following transfer window, however, he returned to division two after joining C.D. Feirense on a short-term deal. After achieving promotion and renewing his contract, he went on to spend a further three seasons with the team, being relegated at the end of 2018–19 and subsequently released.

In the 2019 off-season, Machado signed a three-year contract with Moreirense FC. He moved abroad for the first time in his career in September 2020, joining NorthEast United FC of the Indian Super League.

References

External links

1992 births
Living people
People from Lamego
Sportspeople from Viseu District
Portuguese footballers
Association football wingers
Primeira Liga players
Liga Portugal 2 players
Campeonato de Portugal (league) players
U.S.C. Paredes players
S.C. Freamunde players
C.D. Tondela players
C.D. Feirense players
Moreirense F.C. players
Indian Super League players
NorthEast United FC players
Ekstraklasa players
Radomiak Radom players
Portuguese expatriate footballers
Expatriate footballers in India
Expatriate footballers in Poland
Portuguese expatriate sportspeople in India
Portuguese expatriate sportspeople in Poland